Commonwealth Building may refer to:

 Commonwealth Building (Louisville) 
 Commonwealth Building (Pittsburgh)
 Commonwealth Building (Portland, Oregon)

See also
 Commonwealth (disambiguation)